Hellbenders is a 2012 American comedy horror film written and directed by J. T. Petty. The film stars Clifton Collins Jr., Clancy Brown, Andre Royo, Robyn Rikoon, Macon Blair and Stephen Gevedon. The film was released on October 18, 2013, by The Film Arcade.

Cast
Clifton Collins Jr. as Lawrence
Clancy Brown as Angus
Andre Royo as Stephen
Robyn Rikoon as Elizabeth
Macon Blair as Macon
Stephen Gevedon as Clint
Larry Fessenden as Detective Elrod
Dan Fogler as Eric

Release
The film premiered at the 2012 Toronto International Film Festival on September 9, 2012. The film was released on October 18, 2013, by The Film Arcade.

References

External links
 
 
 

2012 films
2012 comedy horror films
American comedy horror films
Films directed by J. T. Petty
2012 3D films
American 3D films
American supernatural horror films
Demons in film
American exploitation films
American splatter films
2010s English-language films
2010s American films